Giovanni Magaña-Rivera (born April 21, 1998) is an American soccer player.

Playing career

Youth, college and amateur
Magaña-Rivera played with the Portland Timbers academy, before playing college soccer at the University of Portland in 2016. During his time with the Pilots, Magaña-Rivera made 71 appearances, scoring 11 goals and tallying 7 assists.

Whilst at college, Magaña-Rivera played in the USL League Two with Portland Timbers U23s.

FC Tucson
On January 13, 2020, Magaña-Rivera signed with USL League One side FC Tucson.

References 

American soccer players
Association football midfielders
FC Tucson players
Portland Pilots men's soccer players
Portland Timbers players
Portland Timbers U23s players
Soccer players from Oregon
USL League One players
USL League Two players
People from Hood River, Oregon
1998 births
Living people